Annie Wan Lai-kuen (born 1961) is a Hong Kong contemporary artist known for her ceramics works.

Life
Wan was born in 1961 in Hong Kong. In 1982 she received a Diploma in Design from Hong Kong Polytechnic University, followed by a BA in Fine Arts from the Chinese University of Hong Kong in 1996. In 1999 she earned a Master of Fine Arts from the Chinese University of Hong Kong.

Exhibitions 
Solo exhibitions
 2013   “Text · Book”, 1a Space, Hong Kong
 2003   “Moulding World – Ceramic World by Annie Wan”, Hong Kong Visual Arts Centre, Hong Kong
 2005   “Moulding World – A Summer in Denmark”, the Habitus, Hong Kong
 2001   “Rediscovery”, the First Institute of Art and Design Gallery, Hong Kong
 2000   “Blue and White”, Gallerie Martini, Hong Kong
 1999   “Longing and Rediscovery, Hui Gallery, CUHK
 1998   “Ceramic Works by Wan Lai Kuen”, Hong Kong Cultural Centre, Hong Kong

Collections 
Wan's work is included in the permanent collections of the University of Salford and the Burger Collection. Her works are also held by the collections of The Hong Kong Museum of Art, the Hong Kong Heritage Museum, the New Taipei City Yingge Ceramics Museum, Taiwan and Guldageraard, Denmark.

References 

Living people
Hong Kong sculptors
Hong Kong women artists
Chinese contemporary artists
Academic staff of Hong Kong Baptist University
1961 births